Sutukung Bani Forest Park is a Forest Park in the Gambia. It covers six hectares.

It is located in the Lower River area at an altitude of 45 meters.

References

Forest parks of the Gambia